This is a timeline of women's sports, spanning from ancient history up to the 21st century. It includes both competitive sports and notable physical feats.

Early history
2134–2000 BCE – Illustrations on Egyptian temple walls from the Eleventh Dynasty showed women exercising and playing ball games.

6th century BCE – The Heraean Games were the first recorded women's athletic competition, held in the stadium at Olympia.

368 BCE – Spartan charioteer Euryleonis won the two-horse chariot races in that year's Olympic games. A bronze statue was erected in Sparta in her honour.

2nd century CE – Contemporary writers and historians described female gladiators fighting in Rome.

25–220 – Han Dynasty-era frescoes depict women playing the ancient game of Tsu Chu. There are a number of opinions about the dates of the frescoes with the earliest estimates around 5000 BCE.

1296 – At a Christmas feast for Edward I of England, an acrobat named either Maud or Matilda Makejoy performed acrobatic feats as part of the entertainment.

Pre-Columbian era – In the Americas, women from many indigenous tribes participated in sports such as foot races, swimming, stick and ball games, and wrestling contests. Starting in the 16th century, however, European settlers and colonial influence gradually began limiting athletic opportunities for indigenous women, particularly as Europeans tried to forcibly assimilate indigenous people into Western culture.

1493 – When Italian noblewoman Beatrice d'Este visited Venice, a regatta was held in which fifty peasant women competed.

1567 – Mary, Queen of Scots became the first recorded woman to play golf in Scotland at Musselburgh Links.

18th century
1722 – English champion boxer Elizabeth Wilkinson won her first public bout, after challenging a local woman to a fight.

1745 – The first recorded women's cricket match took place in Surrey, England. By the second half of the eighteenth century, women's cricket matches played between local teams became common in the South East of England.

1768 – A French woman named Madame Bunel played a highly publicized tennis match against the English Mr. Tomkins. After three sets, she defeated him 2–1, subsequently winning again in a rematch 11 days later.

1780 – At the American horse racing track of Hempstead Plains, Long Island, a three-day equestrian event included a competition for women riders.

1781 – As archery became a popular sport for aristocracy in England, upper-class women and men competed in archery contests and created archery societies such as the Toxophilite Society.

1784 – Elizabeth Thible of France was the first women to fly in a hot air ballon.

1790s – An annual women's association football competition was held in Mid-Lothian, Scotland.

19th century
1811 – The first women's golf tournament is held at the Royal Musselburgh Golf Club, Scotland.

1816 – French tightrope walker Madame Saqui performed in England to celebrate the opening of Vauxhall Bridge. After ascending a 300-ft inclined rope to the top of a tower, she completed one of her signature tricks, running back down along the rope while fireworks exploded in the background.

1819 – In a New York City exhibition, a Mrs. Adolphe became the first woman to publicly walk on a tightrope.

1825 – Madame Johnson ascended from New York in a hot air balloon in New York, later landing in a swamp in the neighboring state of New Jersey.

1842 – English rower Ann Glanville achieved national celebrity becoming known as the champion female rower of the world; her all-women crew often winning against the best male teams.

1856 – The Swedish swimmer and bath house director Nancy Edberg arranged her first public Swimming exhibitions with female swimmers.

1858 – On August 5, the American Julia Archibald Holmes became the first woman to climb to the summit of Pike's Peak in Colorado.

1863 – Association football governing bodies introduced standardized rules to prohibit violence on the pitch, making it more socially acceptable for women to play.

1864 – A group of 25 founding members form the Park Place Croquet Club of Brooklyn. Croquet is believed to be the first game played by both sexes in the United States.

1866 – Two baseball teams with female players were formed at Vassar College in New York.

1867 – The first ladies golf club was formed at St. Andrew's in Scotland. It gained 500 members by 1886.

1867 – The Dolly Vardens from Philadelphia, Pennsylvania, an all African-American baseball team, became the first women's professional sports team.

1870 – An image of a women's double scull race made the cover of Harper's Weekly in 1870.

1874 – Tennis was introduced to the United States by  Mary Ewing Outerbridge of Staten Island. She brought the needed equipment to the United States from Bermuda and set up the first American court at Staten Island Cricket and Baseball Club.

1875 – The first game of baseball played by women in front of a paying audience took place in Springfield, Illinois on September 11.

1875 – Wellesley College, an all women institution, opened a gymnasium for students to exercise and sponsored the first women's rowing program in the U.S. They also opened up a lake for ice skating.

1876 – In the first women's boxing match held in the United States, Nell Saunders defeated Rose Harland. Her prize was a silver butter dish.

1882 – The YWCA of Boston sponsored the first ever athletic games for women.

1884 – Maud Watson, of England, won the first Ladies' Singles title at Wimbledon.

1887 – Ellen Hansell, an American, became the first women's singles tennis champion. She won the title at the U.S. Open.

1888 – Cyclists competed in the world's first women's bicycle race in New South Wales, Australia. The competitors raced on a course that was two miles (3.2 kilometers) long.

1889 – Bertha Townsend and Margarette Ballard, both of the United States, won the first women's doubles at the U.S. Open.

1890s – Cricket was taught as a sport in several girls' public schools in England including the Roedean School, Wycombe Abbey, the Royal School, and Clifton Ladies.

1890 – Nellie Bly, a reporter for the New York World newspaper, became the first woman to travel around the world alone. She completed the journey on January 25 after 72 days of travel.

1892 – The first women's football match recorded by the Scottish Football Association took place in Glasgow, Scotland.

1892 – Four young women started what became ZLAC Rowing Club in San Diego, California, which is thought today to be the world's oldest continuously existing all-women's rowing club.

1893 – Newnham College Boat Club was formed in Cambridge, England.

1893 – The Ladies' Golf Union, the governing body for women's and girls' amateur golf in Great Britain and Ireland, was founded in St Andrews, Scotland and the first British Ladies Amateur Golf Championship was won by Lady Margaret Scott at Royal Lytham & St Annes Golf Club.

1894 – The most well-documented early European association fool women's team was founded by activist Nettie Honeyball in England and named the British Ladies' Football Club.

1894 – The first golf tournament for women in the United States was won by Hollard A. Ford. Held on a 7-hole course in Morristown, New Jersey, Ford easily won with a  score of 97 on the double-7. She was 14 strokes under the 2nd place golfer.

1895 – In England, the first recorded game of association football between women took place.

1895 – The American Annie Smith Peck climbed the Matterhorn, becoming the first woman to reach the summit.

1895 – At the Meadow Brook Club in Hempstead, New York, 13 women competed in the first women's amateur golf championship in the United States. Mrs. Charles S. Brown won the tournament with a score of 132 and Nellie Sargent came in second place.

1895 – A group of "nimble, supple and vivacious girls" competed in what is considered the first organized athletics meeting in the United States. Hosted by Vassar College and known as a "Field Day," there were running and jumping events.

1895 – Chicago's West Division High School formed the first women's softball team, but they went without a coach four four years until 1899.

1896 – A six day bicycle race for women, the first of its kind, began at New York City's Madison Square Garden on January 6.

1896 – Stanford University and the University of California at Berkeley faced off on April 4 in the first women's intercollegiate basketball championship before a crowd of 700 women. Stanford won, 2–1.

1896 – Stamata Revithi, of Greece, ran the 40-kilometer marathon during the 1896 Summer Olympics in Athens, Greece.

1897 – Adine Masson, of France, became the first winner of the ladies singles at the French Open.

1898 – Lizzie Arlington pitched for the Philadelphia Reserves. She was the first woman to sign a professional baseball contract.

20th century

1900s 
1900 – The 1900 Summer Olympics in Paris introduces women's events, offering golf, tennis, and croquet. Hélène de Pourtalès of Switzerland was the first woman to win a gold medal as part of a mixed sailing crew. Charlotte Cooper of Great Britain becomes the first individual female winner in an Olympic event. American Margaret Abbott won a gold medal in golf.

1901 – The game of field hockey was introduced to the United States by Constance M.K. at Harvard University.

1904 –  The first public match of the women's sport camogie was played in Meath, Ireland. Camogie was developed as a women's variation of the men's sport hurling, with similar rules and equipment.

1905 – The Camogie Association is founded in Dublin, Ireland to organise and promote the women's sport of camogie in Ireland and across the world.

1905 – Women from Britain and America first play an international golf match, with the British winning 6 matches to 1.

1907 – Adine Masson and Yvonne de Pfoeffel, both of France, won the first women's doubles at the French Open.

1909 – Alice Huyler Ramsey became the first woman to drive across the United States, her home country.

1910s 
1911 – Having inherited the St. Louis Cardinals from her father in 1911, Helene Britton became the first woman to own a major league baseball team. She was the head director of the Cardinals until 1917.

1912 – Fanny Durack, from Australia, became the first female Olympic swimming champion at the 1912 Summer Olympics in Stockholm, Sweden, when she won the women's 100 m freestyle event. Compatriot, Mina Wylie finished second, becoming the first female swimming silver medallist. This was also the first olympics to include women's diving.

1913 – Winifred McNair and Dora Boothby, both of Great Britain, won the first Wimbledon Championships ladies' doubles tournament.

1914 – The rules for women's basketball in the United States were altered to permit half-court play.

1917 – Women's association football became popular on a large scale in the United Kingdom during the First World War, when employment in heavy industry spurred the growth of the game, much as it had done for men fifty years earlier. A team from England played a team from Ireland on Boxing Day 1917 in front of a crowd of 20,000 spectators. The following year, a knock-out competition called the Munitionettes Cup was held which attracted 30 teams. The final was played in front of a crowd of 22,000.

1918 – Marie-Louise Ledru, a French athlete, has been credited as the first woman to race the now-defined marathon distance of 42.195 km. On September 29, 1918, Ledru reportedly completed the Tour de Paris Marathon in a time of 5 hours and 40 minutes and finished in 38th place. The International Association of Athletics Federations, the international governing body for the sport of athletics, however, recognizes Violet Piercy from England as having set the first women's world best in the marathon on October 3, 1926 with a time of 3:40:22.

1919 – Afghanistan became independent from British control and began working to "modernize the country" by introducing new sports and physical fitness opportunities for girls and women. Basketball and volleyball teams were created in all girls' high schools.

1920s 
1920 – Dick, Kerr's Ladies association football team played in the first women's international matches in 1920, against a team from Paris, France, and also made up most of the England team against a Scottish Ladies XI in the same year, winning 22–0.

1920 – The All-Philadelphia team, the first American women's field hockey team, was denied entry to the 1920 Summer Olympics in Antwerp, Belgium. They played, however,in  an English tournament but did not win either game.

1921 – The 1921 Women's Olympiad, held in Monaco, was the first international women's sports event.

1921 – Following the Football Association ban on women's teams on 5 December, the English Ladies' Football Association was formed. A total of 24 teams entered the first competition in the spring of 1922.

1922 – Field hockey had grown enough in the United States that a national governing body, the U.S. Field Hockey Association, was established.

1922 – 1922 Women's World Games, held in Paris, included the first regular track and field competitions for women.

1922 – 1922 Women's Olympiad, held in Monaco.

1922 – Margaret Molesworth, of Australia, won the first Ladies Singles at the Australian Open. Esna Boyd Robertson and Marjorie Mountain, both of Australia, won the first women's doubles.

1923 – 1923 Women's Olympiad, held in Monaco.

1923 – First British track and field Championships Championships, followed shortly thereafter by the first American track and field Championships.

1924 –  1924 Women's Olympiad, held at Stamford Bridge, London.

1926 – The Amateur Athletic Union sponsored the first-ever American national women's basketball championship.

1926 – Gertrude Ederle swam the English Channel. The first woman to do so, she completed the swim in fourteen hours, thirty-one minutes, setting a new record.

1926 – Violet Piercy, an English long-distance runner, was recognized by the International Association of Athletics Federations as having set the first women's world best in the marathon on 3 October with a time of 3:40:22. Piercy was reported to have run unofficially, and her mark was set on the Polytechnic Marathon course between Windsor and London.

1926 – 1926 Women's World Games, held in Gothenburg, Sweden

1927 – The first Women's Boat Race between the University of Oxford and the University of Cambridge was held on The Isis in Oxford, England.

1927 – Women's Eights Head of the River Races began in London, England, one year after the first men's race.

1928 – Women competed in the Olympic games for the first time at the 1928 Summer Olympics in Amsterdam, Netherlands.

1930s 
1930 – Frenchwomen Marguerite Mareuse and Odette Siko became the first women to race at the 24 Hours of Le Mans, finishing 7th overall.

1930 – 1930 Women's World Games, held in Prague, Czechoslovakia

1931 – Women were banned from playing professional baseball by Judge Kenesaw Mountain Landis. Landis was upset that a girl, 17-year-old Jackie Mitchell, had struck out both Babe Ruth and Lou Gehrig during exhibition play.

1932 – The first All-Ireland Senior Camogie Championship is won by Dublin

1932 – Brazilian swimmer Maria Lenk became the first South American woman to participate in the Olympic Games, competing in events for breaststroke, freestyle, and backstroke. She went on to break two world records in breaststroke events.

1932 – Odette Siko became the first woman to achieve a class win at the 24 Hours of Le Mans.

1932 – The Associated Press named American Babe Didrikson as the Woman Athlete of the Year for track and field. Didrickson had earlier driven her team to the Amateur Athletic Union national meet championship. She scored thirty points by herself at the meet. The whole second place team collectively only scored 22.

1934 – The inaugural international Women's Test cricket match took place between the England national women's cricket team and the Australia national women's cricket team in December. The following year, the New Zealand national women's cricket team played them.

1934 – 1934 Women's World Games, held in London, United Kingdom

1936 – The first professional basketball team for women, the All American Red Heads Team, was formed. It was a barnstorming troupe.

1936 – The first American to win a world singles table tennis championship was a woman, Ruth Hughes Aarons.

1937 – Grace Hudowalski was the ninth person and first woman to climb all 46 of the Adirondack High Peaks.

1937 – The first association football "Championship of Great Britain and the World" was played between Dick, Kerr's Ladies F.C. and Edinburgh City Girls.

1940s 
1941 – It was illegal for women to play soccer in Brazil from 1941 to 1979.

1943 – Chicago White Sox owner Philip Wrigley founded the All-American Girls Softball League, the precursor to the All-American Girls Professional Baseball League.

1949 – Marcenia Lyle Alberga was the first woman to play a full season of professional baseball.

1949 – Sara Christian became the first female NASCAR driver, racing in the inaugural race at Charlotte Speedway, even though she had Bob Flock finish the race. In the second official race at Daytona Beach and Road Course, also in 1949, Christian was joined by Ethel Mobley and Louise Smith, with Mobley finishing ahead of the 3, at 11th.

1949 – The inaugural women's Volleyball World Championship is held in the Soviet Union, three years after the inaugural men's event. It becomes the oldest and most important of all the international volleyball events organised by the FIVB.

1950s 
1950 – There not being a rule against it, 12-year-old Kathryn Johnston of Corning, New York became the first girl to play Little League Baseball. Johnson played first base for the King's Dairy team. After that, a rule prohibited girls from playing in Little League; this was in force until 1974.

1951 – Betty Chapman, an African-American, broke the color barrier by becoming the first of her race to play professional softball.

1952 – Patricia McCormick began bullfighting as a professional Matadora in January 1952, and was the first American to do so.

1953 – The first international women's basketball championship is held, including teams (in order of final standing) from the US, Chile, France, Brazil, Paraguay, Argentina, Peru, Mexico, Switzerland, Paraguay and Cuba.

1953 – Toni Stone, also known by her married name Marcenia Lyle Alberga, was the first of three women to play Negro league baseball, and thus the first woman to play as a regular on an American big-league professional baseball team.

1954 – The first international women's rowing races were introduced at the European Rowing Championships.

1954 – The All-American Girls Professional Baseball League played its final game and folded.

1955 – The Ladies Professional Golf Association held their first championship.

1958 – An Italian, Maria Teresa de Filippis, became the first woman to drive in a European Grand Prix.

1959 – Arlene Pieper became the first woman to officially finish a marathon in the United States when she finished the Pikes Peak Marathon.

1960s 
1965 – Australia beat the United States in the final game of the first international women's softball tournament, 1-0. The tournament was held in Melbourne, Australia.

1966 – The first basketball tournament for women's collegiate teams was held in Pennsylvania.

1966 – The American Roberta Louise "Bobbi" Gibb was the first woman to run the entire Boston Marathon.

1969 – The English Women's Football Association was formed.

1967 – The American Kathrine Switzer was the first woman to run the Boston Marathon as a numbered entry.

1967 – Nancy Greene, a Canadian, became the first woman's season champion in the World Cup of ski racing.

1969 – Barbara Jo Rubin became the first female jockey to win a race in the United States.

1970s 
1970s – Italy became the first country with professional women's association football players on a part-time basis.

1971 – The Football Association's ban on women's matches being played on members' grounds was lifted. In the same year, UEFA recommended that the women's game should be taken under the control of the national associations in each country.

1971 – Cheryl White, an American, became the first black female jockey.

1971 – The rules of women's basketball in the United States were changed to have five players per team using a full court. A thirty-second shot clock was also implemented.

1971 –  The Amateur Athletic Union ruled that "certain women" could take part in marathons, provided they either started their race 10 minutes before or after the men or on a different starting line. The different starting line requirement was dropped in 1972.

1972 – Title IX of the Educational Amendment of 1972 was signed by President Richard Nixon, prohibiting sex-based discrimination in any school or other education program that receives federal money.

1972 – The American Nina Kuscsik became the first woman to officially win the Boston Marathon.

1973 – Billie Jean King won the "Battle of the Sexes" tennis match against Bobby Riggs in America.

1973 – The US Open was the first Grand Slam tournament to offer equal prize money.

1973 – Terry Williams Munz became the first woman in America awarded an athletic scholarship when she accepted a golf scholarship from the University of Miami.

1974 – Angela Hernandez (also known as Angela Hernandez Gomez and just Angela), of Spain, won a case in the Spanish Supreme Court allowing women to be bullfighters in Spain; a prohibition against women doing so was put in place in Spain in 1908.

1974 – The Women's Sports Foundation was created by Billie Jean King in America. It is "a charitable educational organization dedicated to increasing the participation of girls and women in sports and fitness and creating an educated public that supports gender equity in sport."

1974 – Seven teams joined together to form the Women's Professional Football League.

1974 – The Portland Mavericks hired Lanny Moss to manage the team. She was the first woman to serve as skipper for a professional men's baseball team.

1974 – Girls were formally permitted to play in the Little League Baseball program as result of a lawsuit brought on behalf of Frances Pescatore and Jenny Fulle.

1975 – Junko Tabei of Japan became the first woman to reach the summit of Mount Everest.

1976 – Krystyna Choynowski-Liskiewicz, a native of Poland, sailed around the world by herself. When she finished on March 28 she was the first woman to do so.

1976 – The Connecticut Falcons won the first Women's Professional Softball World Series Championship.

1976 – Nadia Comăneci, at the time a 15-year-old Romanian gymnast, won three Olympic gold medals at the 1976 Summer Olympics in Montreal, Canada, and was the first gymnast to be awarded a perfect score of 10 in an Olympic gymnastic event.

1976 – Women's rowing was added to the Olympic Games programme at a distance of 1000 metres.

1977 – The American Janet Guthrie was the first woman to compete in the Indianapolis 500 and the Daytona 500, and the first woman to lead a NASCAR Winston Cup Series event.

1977 – The American Shirley Muldowney was the first woman to win a (in the first of three) NHRA Winston Drag Racing Series, in the Top Fuel category.

1979 – United States Women's National Team took home the top prize, a gold medal, at the Pan-American Games.

1979 – Crystal Fields, who competed against all boys in the finals, became the first girl to win a baseball Pitch, Hit, and Run competition.

1979 – It was illegal for women to play soccer in Brazil from 1941 to 1979.

1979 – American Lyn Lemaire was the first woman to compete in an Ironman Triathlon. She placed sixth overall.

1980s 
1980 – American Mary Decker became the first woman to run a sub-4:30 mile.

1981 – French rally driver Michèle Mouton became the first female driver to win overall at world championship event in rallying when she won the Rallye Sanremo.

1982 – Kathy Rude became the first woman to win a professional road race in the United States when she won her class at the 24 Hours of Daytona and later became the first woman to set a lap record at Charlotte Motor Speedway.

1982 – The National Collegiate Athletic Association began sponsoring women's basketball.

1982 – The Springnationals round of NHRA Winston Drag Racing Series marked by the first ever female vs female final between Shirley Muldowney and Lucille Lee.

1984 – The U.S. Women's softball team beat China, 1-0, to win the first Women's International Cup championship.

1984 – The first Olympic marathon for women was held in Los Angeles. American Joan Benoit won.

1985 – The distance for Women's rowing in the Olympic Games programme was extended to 2000 metres, the distance raced at the 1988 Summer Olympics in Seoul, South Korea, and thereafter, consistent with men's rowing events at the Olympics.

1985 – A year after finishing 2nd (and winning her class) Michèle Mouton became the first woman to win overall at the Pikes Peak International Hill Climb.

1985 – The American Libby Riddles became the first woman to win the Iditarod (Mary Shields was the first woman to complete the race in 1974, finishing 23rd).

1985 – The United States national soccer team was formed.

1986 – The American Ann Bancroft was the first woman to reach the North Pole by foot and dogsled, and "...she became the first known woman to cross the ice to the North Pole."

1987 – Tania Aebi completed a solo circumnavigation of the globe in a 26-foot sailboat between the ages of 18 and 21, making her the first American woman to sail around the world.

1987 – The first women's world championship in weightlifting was held; it was held in Daytona Beach, Florida and won by the American Karyn Marshall.

1987 – The [American] National Girls and Women in Sports Day (NGWSD) is an annual day of observance held during the first week of February to acknowledge the accomplishments of female athletes, recognize the influence of sports participation for women and girls, and honor the progress and continuing struggle for equality for women in sports.

1988 – The first Henley Women's Regatta took place at Henley-on-Thames in England.

1988 – The American Shawna Robinson was the first woman to win a NASCAR-sanctioned stock car race, winning in the Charlotte/Daytona Dash Series at New Asheville Speedway.

1989 – Japan became the first country to have a semi-professional women's football league, the L. League, which is still in existence today.

1989 – The first woman to play first base in NCAA baseball play took to the field. Julie Croteau played for Division III's St. Mary's College in Maryland.

1989 – Arantxa Sanchez beat Setffi Graf to win the Grand Slam. At only 17 years old she became the first Spanish woman to do so.

1990s 
1991 – All new sports applying to be included in the Olympic program were required to feature women's events.

1991 – Algerian middle-distance runner Hassiba Boulmerka became the first African woman to win a world championship in track and field. She won the 1500-meter race.

1991 – The United States won FIFA's first ever Women's World Cup.

1992 – Major League Baseball lifted the ban on the signing of women to contracts, a ban that had existed since 1952.

1992 – Manon Rheaume signed a contract with the Tampa Bay Lightning of the NHL, appearing in preseason exhibition games in 1992 and 1993. She spent 5 years in professional minor leagues, playing for a total of seven teams and appearing in 24 games. She also played on the Canada's Women's Ice Hockey Team, winning gold medals at the IIHF Women's World Championship in 1992 and 1994, and the silver medal at the 1998 Winter Olympics in Nagano, Japan.

1993 – The San Francisco Giants hired Sherry Davies as their public address announcer. She was the first woman in this position in all of major league baseball.

1993 – USA Boxing officially lifted its ban on women's boxing in 1993.

1993 – The American Julie Krone became the first female jockey to win a Triple Crown race when she won the Belmont Stakes.

1995 – Ila Borders, playing for Southern California College, was the first woman to start as pitcher in a men's collegiate baseball game.

1996 – The first Asian conference on women and sports took place in Manila, the Philippines. Approximately 150 participants from more than 12 Asian nations attended the conference, and discussions culminated in the Manila Declaration on Women and Sport, which declared support for women in sports.

1996 – Women's soccer and women's softball became medal sports at the 1996 Summer Olympics in Atlanta for the first time; both events were won by US teams.

1996 – The first baseball glove made to fit a woman's hand was sold by Spalding Sports.

1997 – The WNBA began in America.

1999 – Carolina Morace signed a two year contract as the coach of Unione Sportiva Viterbese 1908, becoming the first woman to coach an Italian men's professional soccer team.

1999 – Tori Murden became the first woman and the first American to row solo across the Atlantic Ocean.

21st century

2000s 
2000 – German Sandra Farmand won the World Cup snowboard women's cross race.

2000 – The Aggressive Skaters Association created the so-called "Fabiola Rule", after Fabiola da Silva, which allowed women to compete in the formerly all-male vert competition.

2001 – Jutta Kleinschmidt of Germany became the first woman to win the Paris–Dakar Rally.

2004 – Lilian Bryner of Switzerland became the first woman to win overall in an international 24-hour auto race when she helped to win the 2004 Spa 24 Hours.

2005 – The American Danica Patrick was the first woman to lead the Indianapolis 500.

2005 – The New York City Marathon awarded the female champion $130,000, compared to just $100,000 for the male winner. It is thought to be the first time a sporting event paid the female winner more than it paid to the male. Additionally, it was the largest prize ever awarded at a marathon.

2006 – Julie Wafaei of Canada became the first woman to row across the Atlantic Ocean from mainland to mainland in March.

2007 – A year following the French Open, the Wimbledon Championships was the last of the Grand Slam tournament to offer equal prize money.

2008 – The American Danica Patrick was the first woman to win an IndyCar Series by winning the 2008 Indy Japan 300.

2009 – Sarah Outen, from Britain, became the first woman to row alone across the Indian Ocean.

2010s 
2010 – Roz Savage, from England, became the first woman to row solo across the Pacific Ocean.

2010 – The American Kelly Kulick won the 2010 PBA Tournament of Champions, where she was the first-ever female competitor in the field. This also made her the first woman to win any Professional Bowlers Association Tour event that was also open to men.

2011 – Leena Gade became the first female race engineer to lead a car to win at 24 Hours of Le Mans.

2012 –  The 2012 Summer Olympics in London were the first Games in which women competed in all sports in the program, and every participating country included female athletes. The U.S. Olympic team had more women than men for the first time — 269 female athletes to 261 men.

2012 – Felicity Aston, of Britain, became the first person to ski alone across the Antarctic land-mass using only personal muscle power, as well as the first woman to cross the Antarctic land-mass alone.

2012 – The World Rugby launched the competition now known as the World Rugby Women's Sevens Series, analogous to the men's World Rugby Sevens Series.

2013 – The American Danica Patrick was the first woman to win a NASCAR Cup Series pole position for the Daytona 500, a week later was the first woman to lead the Daytona 500.

2013 – On her fifth attempt and at age 64, the American Diana Nyad was the first person confirmed to swim from Cuba to Florida without the protection of a shark cage, swimming from Havana to Key West.

2013 – Emily Bell became the first woman to kayak the length of Britain.

2014 – At the 2014 Winter Olympics in Sochi, Russia, Torah Bright, from Australia, became the first woman to qualify for three snowboard disciplines; specifically snowboard cross, halfpipe and slopestyle. The first women competed in ski jumping at the Olympics.

2014 – Alia Atkinson, from Jamaica, won the 100m breaststroke at the 2014 Short Course World Championships in Doha, becoming the first black woman to win a world swimming title.

2014 – Abbey Holmes became the first woman to kick 100 goals in one regular season of Australian Rules football.

2014 – Annabel Anderson, from New Zealand, became the first woman to cross Cook Strait standing on a paddleboard.

2014 – Peta Searle became the first woman appointed as a development coach in the Australian Football League when she was chosen by St Kilda as a development coach.

2014 – 16-year-old Katie Ormerod, from Britain, became the first female snowboarder to land a backside double cork 1080.

2014 – Shelby Osborne became the first female defensive back in American football when she was drafted by Campbellsville University in Kentucky.

2014 – Amélie Mauresmo, from France, became the first woman to coach a top male tennis player (specifically, Andy Murray.) 

2014 – Gabrielle Augustine pitched the final two innings for Hunter's Inn, thus becoming the first woman to play in the Glenwood Baseball League, which is the longest-running amateur baseball league in the United States, founded in 1920.

2014 – Tara Remington from New Zealand and Angela Madsen from California became the first female pair of rowers to cross the Pacific Ocean from California to Hawaii; this trip also made Angela Madsen the first paraplegic to row from California to Hawaii.

2014 – Michele A. Roberts was elected as the new Executive Director of the National Basketball Players Association, thus making her the first woman to be elected to the highest position of a major sport's players association within the United States.

2014 – Corinne Diacre became the first woman to coach a men's professional soccer team (Clermont Foot) in a competitive match in France on August 4, 2014, her 40th birthday.

2014 – Andrea Skews became the first woman to complete the Birdsville Track run from Marree, South Australia, to Birdsville, Queensland.

2014 – Nicola Scaife, from Australia, won the first women's hot air balloon world championship, which was held in Poland.

2014 – Cecilia Brækhus, from Norway, became the first Norwegian and the first woman to hold all major world championship titles in her weight division (welterweight) in boxing.

2014 – Kelly Xu, of Santa Monica, Calif., won the girls 7–9 division in the Drive, Chip and Putt Championship, thus becoming the first female champion ever crowned at Augusta National Golf Club.

2014 –  After an announcement on May 31, women competed in medieval combat as a sport for the first time at the International Medieval Combat Federation (IMCF) world championship. American Amy Graham and the women's melee team USA Valkyries (Sandra Lagnese, Karen Prentice, Kati Takacs, Suzanne Lyons Elleraas) won gold medals.

2015 – Mieko Nagaoka, a 100-year-old Japanese woman, became the first centenarian to complete a 1500m swim in a 25-meter pool; specifically, she completed 30 laps of the pool in 1 hour, 15 minutes, 54 seconds, in a masters event in Matsuyama, Japan.

2015 – The first African-Americans to place in the top three spots at the 100 yard freestyle in any Women's Division I NCAA Swimming Championship were: Simone Manuel, Lia Neal, and Natalie Hinds in that order.

2015 – Saina Nehwal became the first Indian women's player to be World No.1 in badminton.

2015 – Diane Reid became the first Canadian woman to be appointed as skipper in the world's longest ocean race, the Clipper Round the World Yacht Race. In the same race, Wendy Tuck became the first Australian woman to be appointed as skipper.

2015 – Alia Al Shamsi became the first Emirati female swimmer to represent the country's national team, which she did at the Arab Age Group Swimming Championships.

2015 – The 70th Women's Boat Race was held on The Championship Course in London, England on the same day as the traditional male event for the first time on April 11.

2015 – The World Series of Poker Circuit had its first female main event champion when the American Michelle Chin won the Horseshoe Council Bluffs $1,675 Main Event.

2015 – Kieran Ballard-Tremeer, from South Africa, became the first woman to swim around the Palm Jumeirah; she completed the 14.5 km-distance swim around it in a time of four hours and 28 minutes, swimming inside the breakwater of Palm Jumeirah.

2015 – The American McKenna Haase became the first woman to win a feature Sprint Car race at Knoxville Raceway.

2015 – The first American all-girls national baseball tournament was held.

2015 – The first known all-girls tackle football league in America, the Utah Girls Tackle Football League, was formed.

2015 – Melissa Mayeux of France became the first female baseball player to be added to Major League Baseball's international registration list.

2015 – New Zealand native Kim Chambers became the first woman to swim the 30-mile stretch between the Farallon Islands and San Francisco.

2015 – Tickets for the Women's Singles final of the 2015 US Open sold out faster than the Men's final, a first in tournament history.

2015 – Sarah Taylor, from England, became the first woman to play men's grade cricket in Australia, when she appeared as wicketkeeper for Northern Districts against Port Adelaide at Salisbury Oval in South Australia's premier men's competition.

2015 – Afghanistan held its first marathon; among those who ran the entire marathon was one woman, Zainab, age 25, who thus became the first Afghan woman to run in a marathon within her own country.

2015 – Michelle Payne, from Australia, became the first female jockey to win the Melbourne Cup.

2015 – Michelle Rowe, from the United Kingdom, became the first woman to walk the length of Malawi.

2015 – The Raleigh Flyers of the American Ultimate Disc League signed the first ever female professional ultimate frisbee player, Jessi Jones, to play in their game against the Nashville Nightwatch. Jones, who was a team USA U-23 player in 2013, was signed as part of "Women's Ultimate Day".

2016 – Kaillie Humphries, from Canada, became the first woman to drive an all-female team against men in a four-person World Cup bobsled race on January 9; her teammates were Cynthia Appiah, Genevieve Thibault and Melissa Lotholz.

2016 – Chan Yuen-ting of Hong Kong became the first woman to coach a men's professional association football (soccer) team to the championship of a nation's top league. The following year, she became the first woman to coach a male football (soccer) club in a top-flight continental competition when she managed a team against Guangzhou Evergrande in the AFC Champions League.

2017 – In the 2017 season, Jesse Shofner was selected to the roster for the Nashville Nightwatch, which made her the first female player to make a full season American Ultimate Disc League roster. She scored two goals in the Nashville Nightwatch's first game of the 2017 season, making her the first woman to do so in any American Ultimate Disc League game.

2017 – Ana Carrasco of Spain became the first woman to win an individual world championship motorcycle race, when she won the FIM Supersport 300 World Championship.

2017 – Spain's Alhambra Nievas and Ireland's Joy Neville become the first and second women referees to take charge of men's rugby union internationals when they refereed matches in the Rugby Europe Conference.

2018 – The first all-female group crossed Antarctica using muscle power alone; they were all British.

2018 – Katie Sarah, from Australia, became the first woman to summit the highest mountain on every continent and the seven highest volcanic peaks, an accomplishment known as the 'Seven-Seven'.

2018 – Terra Roam of Australia became the first woman to walk solo and unsupported around Australia.

2018 – Wendy Tuck of Australia became the first female skipper to win the Clipper Round the World Yacht Race (or any Round the World yacht race).

2019 – Mariko Yugeta of Japan became the first woman in the world over 60 to run a sub-3-hour marathon; she ran 2:59:15 at the Shimonoseki Kaikyo Marathon at the age of 61.

2019 – Caitlin Nash and Natalie Corless, both of Canada, became the first all-female team to compete in a World Cup doubles race in luge.

2020s

2020 - Lisa Ashton became the first woman to win a PDC Tour card through Q School.

2020 - Sabrina Ionescu of the United States became the first college basketball player to collect 2,000 points, 1,000 assists, and 1,000 rebounds playing for the Oregon Ducks, during her college career at the University of Oregon.

2020 - Alyssa Nakken became the first female to coach for a Major League Baseball team, when the San Francisco Giants officially announced her promotion on January 14, 2020.

2020 - Kim Ng became the first female to be named General Manager of a Major League Baseball team, when the Miami Marlins officially announced the hire on November 13, 2020.

2020 - Becky Hammon was the first female to act as the head coach during the San Antonio Spurs versus Lakers game on December 30, 2020 when head coach Gregg Popovich was ejected in the second quarter.
2021- Katie Sowers the offensive assistant coach for the San Francisco 49er was the first female coach in Super Bowl history. In addition, to being the first coach to represent the LGBTQ community.

2021- Katie Sowers the offensive assistant coach for the San Francisco 49er was the first female coach in Super Bowl history. In addition, to being the first coach to represent the LGBTQ community.

2020-  Sarah Fuller became the first female college football player to receive playtiming for Vanderbilt against the Missouri Tigers Football.

2021- Katie Sowers the offensive assistant coach for the San Francisco 49er was the first female coach in Super Bowl history. In addition, to being the first coach to represent the LGBTQ community.

2021- Sarah Thomas made history being the first female referee to officiate Super Bowl LV.

See also
 Timeline of women's basketball

Notes

References

External links
 History of Women in Sports Timeline, by the  St. Lawrence County Branch of the New York State of AAUW

women

sports